Christian André Jelves Palacios (born 22 January 1991) is a Chilean footballer that currently plays for Deportes Concepción as defensive midfielder at the Segunda División Profesional de Chile.

Club career

Audax Italiano
Born in the capital city of Chile, Santiago, Jelves started his career at the age of fourteen, after he was signed by Audax Italiano. He remained there as a youth player until 2007 when he trained with the first-team squad, under the direction of the coach Raul Toro.

After three years without play, in 2010, Jelves made his Audax Italiano debut, in a 2–1 win over Huachipato at the CAP Stadium. However, he only was featured in one game more in the entire season. For the next season, the coach Omar Labruna had more consideration in Jelves, and was able of make eight appearances of seventeen matches that disputed the team during the 2011 Apertura Tournament.

In August 2022, he joined

References

External links
 BDFA Profile
 Audax Profile

1991 births
Living people
Footballers from Santiago
Chilean footballers
Chilean expatriate footballers
Audax Italiano footballers
Coquimbo Unido footballers
San Marcos de Arica footballers
Curicó Unido footballers
Murciélagos FC footballers
Deportes Valdivia footballers
Deportes Concepción (Chile) footballers
Chilean Primera División players
Segunda División Profesional de Chile players
Primera B de Chile players
Ascenso MX players
Expatriate footballers in Mexico
Chilean expatriate sportspeople in Mexico
Association football midfielders